Flexera is an American computer software company based in Itasca, Illinois.

History 

On 1 April 2008, Macrovision sold its software division to the Thoma Bravo investment fund, which became Acresso Software. Macrovision subsequently changed its name to Rovi Corporation.

In October 2009, Acresso Software, Inc. became Flexera Software after a clash with a company of similar name.

Flexera acquired Australian based ManageSoft in 2010. Managesoft was OSA (Open Software Associates), which itself came out of HP's Australian Software Organisation.

On July 19, 2011, Thoma Bravo sold a majority stake in Flexera Software LLC to Teachers' Private Capital, the private investment department of the Ontario Teachers' Pension Plan. The transaction was finalized on October 3, 2011.

On September 26, 2018, Flexera acquired RightScale for an undisclosed amount.

On June 5, 2019, Flexera acquired Asheville, NC based RISC Networks for an undisclosed amount.

On February 5, 2020, Flexera acquired software usage analytics Company Revulytics. In August 2020, for the third straight year, Flexera has been ranked in the Gartner Magic Quadrant 's Leaders quadrant for Software Asset Management Tools (July 2020).

See also
FlexNet Publisher
InstallShield

References

External links 
 

Software companies based in Illinois
Privately held companies based in Illinois
Companies based in DuPage County, Illinois
2009 establishments in Illinois
Software companies established in 2009
Year of establishment missing
Software companies of the United States
Itasca, Illinois